Cleomachus was an Ancient Greek warrior from Thessaly, notable for his defeat of the Eretrians in the Lelantine War.

Cleomachus was a widely known and celebrated soldier, and was called upon to fight by the Chalcidians in their war against the Eretrians. He agreed to fight and brought his male lover and companion to fight alongside him. Cleomachus charged the Eretrian lines and brought the Chalcidians to victory. Unfortunately, he was slain during the battle, but his courage inspired the Chalcidians and changed their opinions on homosexuality, and they erected a tomb dedicated to him in the marketplace of Chalcis, the pillar of which still stood in Plutarch's days.

Aristotle attributed a popular local song to the legacy of Cleomachus:

Though largely forgotten, Cleomachus is a notable example of Ancient Greek attitudes toward homosexuality.

See also
Homosexuality in Ancient Greece

References

7th-century BC Greek people
Ancient Greeks killed in battle
Greek gay men
Ancient LGBT people